Renaud de Beaujeu is the name of a medieval French author of Arthurian romance. He is known for only one major work, Le Bel Inconnu, the Fair Unknown, a poem of 6266 lines in Old French that was composed in the late-twelfth or early-thirteenth century. Renaud left us his name at the end of this poem: 'Renals de Biauju, or, as usually written, Renaud de Beaujeu', In modern French he is known as Renaut de Beaujeu. Le Bel Inconnu survives in only one manuscript: Chantilly, Bibliothèque du Château, 472 (626).

William Henry Schofield, a Harvard scholar, wrote of Renaud de Beaujeu in 1895: 'He is only known to us otherwise as the author of a song, one stanza of which is preserved in Le Roman de la Rose ou de Guillaume de Dole. As Gaston Paris says, this citation shows, however, that he was a knight and that his song was well known before the year 1200.'

Notes

External links
 

Writers of Arthurian literature
12th-century French writers
French male writers